Hellhound on His Trail (Doubleday), 2010, is a nonfiction book written by author Hampton Sides, focusing on the characters and events surrounding the assassination of Martin Luther King Jr. Using multiple narratives, Hellhound is an attempt at exploring the psychology and emotion that dominated and divided the United States during the Civil Rights Movement.

Synopsis
The work examines the assassination of the civil rights leader Martin Luther King, the manhunt for his killer, and the nation's reaction. Sides looks into the background of James Earl Ray, King's murderer, including his usage of several aliases, including "Eric Starvo Galt". He questions Ray's ability to gain this many aliases on his own and whether or not he may have had an accomplice at some point in time, which Sides believes was very likely.

Reception 
Critical reception for Hellhound on His Trail has been mostly positive. The Daily Telegraph and The Washington Post both praised the work, with The Daily Telegraph calling it "an elegant tale of murder and pursuit, but might have been so much more." The New York Times and The Guardian were slightly more mixed in their reviews. Both wrote overall favorable reviews, but remarked that there were aspects that the author could have  explored further.

Film adaptation
Black Label Media will produce and direct a film adaption, with a spring 2018 target for start of production. The script will be adapted by Scott Cooper who will also direct the film.

See also 
James Earl Ray
Assassination of Martin Luther King, Jr.

References

External links
Book excerpt at the New York Times

2010 non-fiction books
Assassination of Martin Luther King Jr.
Federal Bureau of Investigation